In mathematics, the epigraph or supergraph of a function  valued in the extended real numbers  is the set, denoted by  of all points in the Cartesian product  lying on or above its graph. The strict epigraph  is the set of points in  lying strictly above its graph. 

Importantly, although both the graph and epigraph of  consists of points in  the epigraph consists  of points in the subset  which is not necessarily true of the graph of  
If the function takes  as a value then  will  be a subset of its epigraph  
For example, if  then the point  will belong to  but not to  
These two sets are nevertheless closely related because the graph can always be reconstructed from the epigraph, and vice versa. 

The study of continuous real-valued functions in real analysis has traditionally been closely associated with the study of their graphs, which are sets that provide geometric information (and intuition) about these functions. This is because in general, for such functions, geometric intuition is more readily obtained from a function's epigraph than from its graph. Similarly to how graphs are used in real analysis, the epigraph can often be used to give geometrical interpretations of a convex function's properties, to help formulate or prove hypotheses, or to aid in constructing counterexamples.

Definition

Similarly, the set of points on or below the graph of a function is its . 

The  is the epigraph with the graph removed:

Relationships with other sets

The epigraph being a subset of a vector space allows for tools related to real analysis and functional analysis (and other fields) to be more readily applied. 

The strict epigraph  and the graph  are always disjoint. 

The epigraph of a function  is related to its graph and strict epigraph by 

where set equality holds if and only if  is real-valued. However, 

 

always holds.

Reconstructing functions from epigraphs

The epigraph is empty if and only if the function is identically equal to infinity. 

case 1:  if and only if 
case 2:  if and only if 
case 3: otherwise,  is necessarily of the form  from which the value of  can be obtained by taking the infimum of the interval.

Specifically, for any  

where by definition,  
This same formula can also be used to reconstruct  from its strict epigraph

Relationships between properties of functions and their epigraphs

A function is convex if and only if its epigraph is a convex set. The epigraph of a real affine function  is a halfspace in  

A function is lower semicontinuous if and only if its epigraph is closed.

See also

Citations

References

  
 Rockafellar, Ralph Tyrell (1996), Convex Analysis, Princeton University Press, Princeton, NJ. .

Convex analysis
Mathematical analysis
Variational analysis